Aban ibn Sa'id ibn al-As, was one of the scribes companion of the Islamic Prophet Muhammad, who was appointed as a ruler of Bahrain in place of Al-Ala al-Hadhrami.

Biography 
Aban's father's name is Abu Uhayha Sa'id Ibn al-As and his mother's name is Hind bint Mughira. The fifth male in the upper part of his family went to Abd Mannaf and met Muhammad's dynasty. His father Sa'id was a respected person of Quraysh. Sa'id had several worthy sons. Among them, Khalid and Amr converted to Islam and migrated to Abyssinia in the early days of Islam. He died in Taif as a non-muslim in the 2nd or 3rd year of Hijri and was buried there. Aban remained a pagan with his other two brothers, Ubaidah and al-As. He was getting great pain when his two brothers converted to Islam. He expressed his pain in a poem written by him. One of his verses is as follows:

Aban, along with his two other brothers, continued to oppose Muhammad and the Muslims. He left Mecca with Ubayda and al-As to fight muslims in the Battle of Badr. Ubayda and al-As were slain by Muslims. Aban somehow returned to Mecca with his life.

Before enter Islam 
Ibn Hisham mentions an incident related to Aban's pre-Islam life: In the pre-Islamic era, Muhammad married some of his daughters to the Quraish youth of Mecca. When Muhammad's conflict with the Quraish started, the Quraish leaders appealed to muhammad to divorce his daughters from the son-in-laws. Muhammad's daughter Ruqayyah was the wife of Utbah ibn Abi Lahab. The Quraish said to Utbah: You divorce Muhammad's daughter. He agreed on the condition that she would divorce Ruqayyah if they could marry with him, the daughter of Aban ibn Sa'id, or the daughter of Sa'id ibn al-As. They accepted Utbah's demand and married Sa'id ibn al-As's daughter and overtook Ruqayyah from him.

On the eve of the Treaty of Hudaybiyyah, Muhammad sent Uthman with his message to the Quraish in Mecca. Then Uthman was heading towards Mecca with the 'Baldah' valley. The Quraish asked him: Where to go? Uthman told them what Muhammad had told him. At that time, Aban ibn Sa'id came forward from among the Quraish and welcomed Uthman. He had a close relationship with Uthman beforehand. Aban prepared his horse and lifted Uthman on his back and took charge of his safety. Then Aban brought Uthman to Mecca.

When Uthman came to Aban's house, Aban said to him: Why is this the condition of your clothes? Uthman's shirt was up to the middle of his knees and fanaticism. Aban adds: Why don't you make your clothes as long as the people of Qaum? Uthman said: Our prophet wears a shirt like this. Aban says: You repent the Kaaba. Uthman said: We cannot do it until our Prophet does anything. We just follow in his footsteps.

Story of come towards Islam 
Although Aban had long been hostile to the Prophet of Islam and Islam, he did not refrain from searching for the truth at this time. At that time, he used to ask wise people about Muhammad's prophecy. In those days, al-Sham or Syria was the center of wise and experienced people. Aban had a trip there for business. Once he spoke to a christian by the name of 'Raheeb': 'I am the son of the Quraish tribe of Hijaz. A man from this tribe claims to be the nominee of Allah. He said, God has sent me as a prophet like Jesus and Moses.' Raheeb asked the man's name. Aban said: The man's name is Muhammad. Rahib explained the age, lineage, etc. of the prophet's debut, as described in the Islamic holy books. Hearing his statement, Aban said: All of these exist in that man. Then Raheeb said: 'By Allah, then he will spread all over the world after he dominates the whole of Arabia. When you go back, you will convey my greetings to this righteous servant of Allah.' This Rahib or priest of Sham is called 'Yakka'. This time, when Aban returned from Sham, he had no previous form. The power of opposition to Islam and Muslims is gone.

Aban remained completely silent for a few days, thinking about the religion of his father and his peers and for his condemnation and ridicule. But he could not suppress the passion for truth that had arisen in him for a long time. Meanwhile, his brothers Amr and Khalid returned from Habas and contacted Aban. Then he converted to Islam before the Battle of Khaybar and migrated to Medina. The three brothers together participated in the Khaybar expedition with Muhammad.

According to another description, when Aban reached Medina, he made an emir of a small force of Muhammad and sent him to the Najd. When he returned to Medina after succeeding in this campaign, Khaybar's victory was over. At that time, Abu Hurayrah came to Medina along with other muhajirs of Habas. The two of them approached Muhammad together. Muhammad gave them some parts of the goods of the People's Republic of Khaybar. Apart from the Najd campaign, he received the leadership of some other small expeditions from Muhammad.

Aban participated in the Ta'if expedition with Muhammad. Abu Bakr sees the tomb of Aban's father in Taif and says: God's curse to the inhabitants of this tomb, he opposed to Allah and the Messenger. Aban and his brother, Amr, immediately protested Abu Bakr's words and condemned his father Abu Quhafa. Then Muhammad said: Don't abuse the dead. The living are hurt when they abuse the dead.

After death of Muhammad 
Muhammad appointed Aban as a ruler of Bahrain in place of Al-Ala al-Hadhrami. He performed this duty until Muhammad's death. Hearing the news of Muhammad's death, he returned to Medina.

After Muhammad's death, Abu Bakr was elected caliph. Aban is one of the few Quraish people who have refrained from the Bay'ah for a few days even after the mass marriage is over in his hands. When Banu Hashim's people take Bay'ah, his objections are removed and he makes a statement. Abu Bakr did not remove any ruler or employee appointed by Muhammad. Aban was also a ruler appointed by Muhammad. Abu Bakr requested Aban to return to his charge. But Aban refused the caliph's request. According to some descriptions, the Aban finally took over as ruler of Yaman at repeated requests.

Ibn Sa'd explains: When Aban refused the caliph's request, one day Umar said to Aban: He should not have left the workplace without the permission of the imam or the leader. Now he refuses to go back there at his behest. Aban said: By Allah! I will not work for anyone else after the Messenger of Allah. If I had done so, I would have been abu bakr's 'hope' or employee because of his dignity, his advance in Islam, etc. Abu Bakr consulted the companions on who else could be sent to Bahrain. Uthman said: Since Al-Ala al-Hadhrami was there before him, he should be sent there. Omar also said: Let Aban go there again. But Abu Bakr refused to do so. He said: Can I force anyone who says that I will not do any more work after the Messenger of Allah (peace and blessings of Allah be upon him). Then Al-Ala al-Hadhrami appointed as the ruler of Bahrain.

Death 
There are differences among sirat experts about the duration of Aban's death. According to Musa ibn ʿUqba and most genetic experts, he died at the end of Abu Bakr's caliphate in the battle of Ajnadayn on Hijri 13 (that's 634 CE). According to Ibn Ishaq, he died in the Yarmuk war and even according to some others on the day of Marj al-Saffar. Another description reveals that he died on 27 of Hijri during the caliphate of Uthman and under his supervision Zayd ibn Thabit compiled the Ottoman's manuscript. But there is ample reason to think that the first opinion is correct.

Sources 

Companions of the Prophet
634 deaths
Umayyad Caliphate
Arab people of the Arab–Byzantine wars
People from the Rashidun Caliphate
Banu Umayya